Jean-Henri Naderman (baptised 20 July 1734 – 4 February 1799) was one of the leading harp-makers in Paris in the 18th century, and also a music publisher. He supplied the Royal Household with his instruments and wrote his music in classical style, with a large influence of the baroque. He had two sons, François Joseph Naderman, renowned harpist, and Henri Naderman, harp maker.

Life
Jean-Henri Naderman was baptised (and presumably born) in Lichtenau in the archdiocese of Paderborn, but emigrated to France around 1756 where he began working as a harp manufacturer. Later in 1777 he was licensed to work as a music publisher. He rose to fame when he was commissioned to create and perfect the harps of Queen Marie-Antoinette on her arrival in France, together with the Czech composer and harpist Jean-Baptiste Krumpholtz.

The Naderman single-pedal harp is supposed to have been modelled after the successful eighteenth-century Bavarian single-action mechanism pedal harp, whose manufacture, although claimed by several other harp makers including Jean Paul Vetter of Nuremberg and Johann Hausen of Weimar, is often attributed to Jacob Hochbrucker. Today, six harps of this specific model have been located. Jean-Henri Naderman died in Paris.

Works
Petite chasse
Sonate op. 17 no.2 in F major (harp solo)
12 Études et un thème varié (harp solo)

References

Attribution
This article is based on the translation of the corresponding article of the Russian Wikipedia. A list of contributors can be found there at the History section.

External links
Ornately Decorated Harp by Naderman, 1797 on the National Music Museum - University of South Dakota.

People from Paderborn (district)
1734 births
1799 deaths
18th-century classical composers
French male classical composers
French music publishers (people)
Harp makers
French Romantic composers
18th-century French composers
18th-century French male musicians
20th-century French male musicians